Tom Mandel (born September 12, 1942) is an American poet whose work is often associated with the Language poets. He was born in Chicago and has lived in New York City, Paris and San Francisco. Since 2004, he has lived in Lewes, Delaware with his wife the poet and psychotherapist Beth Joselow.

Biography
Tom Mandel's name at birth was Thomas Oskar Poeller; he was the child of Jewish immigrants who fled Vienna (after the Anschluss) and then Vichy France (after France's defeat by Germany).

Mandel was educated in Chicago's jazz and blues clubs (e.g. Theresa's, The Burning Spear and especially The Sutherland Lounge where he was a regular from his early teenage years) and at the University of Chicago, where he studied with philosophers Richard McKeon and Hannah Arendt, novelist Saul Bellow, classicist and translator David Grene, and art critic Harold Rosenberg on the Committee on Social Thought. A first marriage in Chicago produced two daughters, Jessica and Sarah. He has also lived in New York City, Paris, San Francisco and Lewes, Delaware. In his twenties, he taught at the University of Chicago and the University of Illinois and was also an editor at the Macmillan Company and a consultant to UNESCO. Becoming interested in collaborative technologies and social computing in the early years of the Internet, he went on to found and/or help found several technology companies.

Writing
In San Francisco Mandel became involved with the vein of new poetry that arose there (and in New York) and later became known as Language Poetry. He co-curated a reading series with Ron Silliman at the Grand Piano, a coffee house in San Francisco's Haight-Ashbury neighborhood, continuing a series founded by Barrett Watten and edited and published six issues of the magazine MIAM. He was Director of the Poetry Center at San Francisco State University in 1978-9. He is the author or co-author of over 20 volumes, and his work has been anthologized in The Norton Anthology of Post-Modern Verse, In the American Tree, 49+1: Poètes Americain, and multiple editions of the annual Best American Poetry. Mandel is a co-author of The Grand Piano, an experiment in collective autobiography by ten San Francisco language poets.

Selected bibliography
Ency, 1978, Tuumba (Berkeley, CA)
Erat, 1980, Burning Deck (Providence, RI)
Ready to Go, 1982, Ithaca House (Ithaca, NY)
Central Europe, 1986, Coincidences Press (Oakland, CA)
Some Appearances, 1987, Jimmy's House of Knowledge (Oakland, CA)
Four Strange Books, 1990, Gaz (New York, NY)
Realism, 1991, Burning Deck (Providence, RI)
Letters of the Law, 1994, Sun & Moon Press (Los Angeles, CA)
Prospect of Release, 1996, Chax Press (Tucson, AZ)
Absence Sensorium, with Daniel Davidson, 1997, Potes & Poets Press (Elmwood, CT)
Ancestral Cave, Zasterle, 1997.
To the Cognoscenti, Atelos, 2006.
Partial Wave Form, lnk, 2010.
Some Epigrams of Palladas, lnk, 2010.

Notes and references

External links
Tom Mandel's website - includes information about his writing career as well as his career as a technology entrepreneur and consultant.

1942 births
American male poets
Language poets
Jewish poets
Jewish American writers
Living people
Writers from Chicago
Poets from California
Poets from Delaware
People from Lewes, Delaware
21st-century American Jews